Late Nights (released with the subtitle Late Nights: The Album) is the third studio album by American singer Jeremih. It was released on December 4, 2015, by Def Jam Recordings. The album serves as a sequel to his mixtape Late Nights with Jeremih (2012) and the follow-up to his second studio album All About You (2010). Recording sessions took place during 2013 to 2015. The production on the album was handled by several producers, including: London on da Track, The Mekanics, Soundz, DJ Mustard, Needlz, Vinylz and Frank Dukes, among others. The album features guest appearances from Ty Dolla $ign, Jhené Aiko, Migos, Juicy J, YG, Twista, Future, Big Sean, J. Cole and Feather. Late Nights was supported by four singles; "Don't Tell 'Em", "Planez", "Oui" and "Pass Dat".

Background and release
At first, the album was originally called Thumpy Johnson and was supposed to be released in 2013. In August 2014, Jeremih announced that he was changing the title of the album to Late Nights: The Album as the sequel to his mixtape Late Nights with Jeremih that was released in 2012. In an XXL interview, he explained why he decided to change the title: On August 4, 2014, Jeremih released a mixtape called N.O.M.A. (Not On My Album) to show all the songs he recorded that weren't going to be on the album. One song on the mixtape called "Can't Go No Mo" featuring Juicy J was originally meant to be on the track list of Late Nights.

In an interview with Billboard, Jeremih explains how his personal issues is the reason for the album delays. He says:  Jeremih also expressed some frustration with his label. "Def Jam is hesitating and not being on my side," he explained. "I see other artists and how they're supported. It's hard when I'm on a roster with Rihanna, Rick Ross and Kanye West".

On May 15, 2015, in a separate interview with Billboard, producer and frequent Jeremih collaborator Mick Schultz confirmed that the originally released track listing and album cover had been changed and was no longer accurate.

On November 21, 2015, the official album artwork, release date and track list was leaked by music streaming service Deezer. The following day, snippets of the album were leaked to the internet. With no announcement or promotion to confirm its release prior, the album was officially released to digital platforms and streaming services on December 4, 2015.

Singles
The first single, "Don't Tell 'Em" featuring YG was released on June 6, 2014. The single became his third top 10 hit and eventually went triple platinum. The second single, "Planez" featuring J. Cole was released on January 22, 2015. The single reached top 10 on urban and rhythmic radio and later went triple Platinum.  "Oui" was released as the third single from the album on October 30, 2015. The single reached number 19 on the Billboard Hot 100 becoming his fourth top 20 hit as lead artist. "Pass Dat" was released as a promotional single, along with the album's pre-order on December 1, 2015. The track was sent to urban contemporary radio on April 12, 2016, as the fourth single.

"Tonight Belongs to U!" featuring Flo Rida was released on April 21, 2015, but was scrapped from the final tracklist. The first promotional single, "Royalty" featuring Big Sean and Future was released October 29, 2015. The second promotional single is "Peace Sign" featuring Fabolous and Red Cafe was released November 18, 2015 but didn't appear on the album. Jeremih expressed in an interview with German music journalist Malcolm Ohanwe, that he had plans to issue "Impatient" with Ty Dolla Sign as a single. Despite never being released, the track was certified Gold by the RIAA in 2017 and later double platinum in 2020.

Critical reception

Late Nights was met with  generally positive reviews from music critics. At Metacritic, which assigns a normalized rating out of 100 to reviews from mainstream publications, the album received an average score of 78, based on seven reviews. Aggregator AnyDecentMusic? gave Late Nights 7.4 out of 10, based on their assessment of the critical consensus.

Meghan Garvey of Pitchfork said, "Late Nights, in its subtle seduction, feels all the more special in an era that increasingly rewards artists who shout the loudest. Jeremih makes you shut everything else out so that you can hear him whisper in your ear. It was worth the wait." David Sackllah of Consequence of Sound said, "Jeremih's vision is astounding, and the places in which he gets to indulge in adventurous risk-taking more than make up for the safe plays that surround them." Brooklyn Russell of Tiny Mix Tapes said, Jeremih's a night owl, not a lark, and on Late Nights: The Album — his first in a lustrum — he retreats even further from the spotlight he seemed predestined for, carefully crafting an album that surprisingly finds tranquility in the 28-year-old's thrill-seeker ways." Colin Joyce of Spin said, "It's a haze, reflective of the real world consequences of living out the entirety of your life in the twilight hours. Or maybe it's just the head trauma, from the setbacks and knockdowns that threatened to abort this record before it had a chance to even enter the room. Either way, the beauty's in the blur." Shirley Ju of HipHopDX said, "Song after song limbers as you go through them and guest appearances from some of the game's hottest artists ensures that he doesn't feel years late. In truth, he doesn't need them, delivering apple-pie-like R&B like the retro futurist he's been trying to be. Late Nights is exactly what Jeremih needed to get his career moving." Andy Kellman of AllMusic said, "Despite the winding path that led to it, Late Nights is together, neither tentative nor overcooked. It's apparently truer to Jeremih's vision than his first two albums, though only the most attentive listening reveals an artist with more dimensions – or more vocal ability – than the one who sang "Birthday Sex" and "Down on Me."

Accolades

Commercial performance
Late Nights debuted at number 42 on the US Billboard 200, selling 19,000 album equivalent units, and 10,000 pure album copies in its first week. Despite the album's initial soft debut, On March 15, 2016, the album was certified gold by the Recording Industry Association of America (RIAA) for combined sales and album-equivalent units of over 500,000 units in the United States. Later on March 20, 2018, the album was certified platinum.

Track listing
Credits adapted from Jeremih's official website.

Notes
  signifies a co-producer.
  signifies an additional producer.
  signifies a vocal producer.
  signifies an additional vocal producer.
 "Pass Dat" features additional vocals by Starrah.
 "Giv No Fuks" features background vocals by Herbert Travis.

Sample credits
 "Planez" contains interpolations of "Put It in Your Mouth" written by Akinyele Adams, Reginald Hargis and Kia Jeffries, as performed by Akinyele.
 "Oui" contains samples from "If I Ever Fall in Love" written by C. Martin, as performed by Shai.
 "Don't Tell 'Em" contains interpolations from the composition "Rhythm Is a Dancer" written by B. Benitez, J. Garrett and T. Austin, as performed by Snap!
 "Giv No Fuks" contains samples of "Ophelia" written by André Popp, as performed by André Popp.
 "Actin' Up" contains an interpolation of "Rain Dance" written by Jeff Lorber, as performed by The Jeff Lorber Fusion.

Charts

Weekly charts

Year-end charts

Certifications

Release history

References 

2015 albums
Jeremih albums
Def Jam Recordings albums
Albums produced by DJ Mustard
Albums produced by Vinylz
Albums produced by Murda Beatz
Albums produced by Frank Dukes
Albums produced by Needlz